Ambroise Paul Toussaint Jules Valéry (30 October 1871 – 20 July 1945) was a French poet, essayist, and philosopher.  In addition to his poetry and fiction (drama and dialogues), his interests included aphorisms on art, history, letters, music, and current events. Valéry was nominated for the Nobel Prize in Literature in 12 different years.

Biography
Valéry was born to a Corsican father and Genoese-Istrian mother in Sète, a town on the Mediterranean coast of the Hérault, but he was raised in Montpellier, a larger urban center close by. After a traditional Roman Catholic education, he studied law at university and then resided in Paris for most of the remainder of his life, where he was, for a while, part of the circle of Stéphane Mallarmé.

In 1900, he married Jeannine Gobillard, a friend of Stéphane Mallarmé's family, who was also a niece of the painter Berthe Morisot. The wedding was a double ceremony in which the bride's cousin, Berthe Morisot's daughter, Julie Manet, married the painter Ernest Rouart. Valéry and Gobillard had three children: Claude, Agathe and François.

Valéry served as a juror with Florence Meyer Blumenthal in awarding the Prix Blumenthal, a grant given between 1919 and 1954 to young French painters, sculptors, decorators, engravers, writers, and musicians.

Though his earliest publications date from his mid-twenties, Valéry did not become a full-time writer until 1920, when the man for whom he worked as private secretary, a former chief executive of the Havas news agency, Edouard Lebey, died of Parkinson's disease.  Until then, Valéry had, briefly, earned his living at the Ministry of War before assuming the relatively flexible post as assistant to the increasingly impaired Lebey, a job he held for some twenty years.

After his election to the Académie française in 1925, Valéry became a tireless public speaker and intellectual figure in French society, touring Europe and giving lectures on cultural and social issues as well as assuming a number of official positions eagerly offered to him by an admiring French nation. He represented France on cultural matters at the League of Nations, and he served on several of its committees, including the sub-committee on Arts and Letters of the Committee on Intellectual Cooperation. The English-language collection The Outlook for Intelligence (1989) contains translations of a dozen essays related to these activities.

In 1931, he founded the Collège International de Cannes, a private institution teaching French language and civilization. The Collège is still operating today, offering professional courses for native speakers (for educational certification, law and business) as well as courses for foreign students.

He gave the keynote address at the 1932 German national celebration of the 100th anniversary of the death of Johann Wolfgang Goethe. This was a fitting choice, as Valéry shared Goethe's fascination with science (specifically, biology and optics).

In addition to his activities as a member of the Académie française, he was also a member of the Academy of Sciences of Lisbon, and of the Front national des Ecrivains. In 1937, he was appointed chief executive of what later became the University of Nice. He was the inaugural holder of the Chair of Poetics at the Collège de France.

During World War II, the Vichy regime stripped him of some of these jobs and distinctions because of his quiet refusal to collaborate with Vichy and the German occupation, but Valéry continued, throughout these troubled years, to publish and to be active in French cultural life, especially as a member of the Académie française.

Valéry was nominated for the Nobel Prize in Literature twelve times. It is believed that the Swedish Academy intended to award Valéry the prize in 1945, had he not died that year.

Valéry died in Paris in July 1945. He is buried in the cemetery of his native town, Sète, the same cemetery celebrated in his famous poem Le Cimetière marin.

Work

The great silence
Valéry is best known as a poet, and he is sometimes considered to be the last of the French symbolists. However, he published fewer than a hundred poems, and none of them drew much attention.  On the night of 4 October 1892, during a heavy storm, Paul Valéry underwent an existential crisis, an event that made a huge impact on his writing career. Eventually, around 1898, he quit writing altogether, publishing not a word for nearly twenty years. This hiatus was in part due to the death of his mentor, Stéphane Mallarmé. When, in 1917, he finally broke his 'great silence' with the publication of La Jeune Parque, he was forty-six years of age.

La Jeune Parque
This obscure, but sublimely musical, masterpiece, of 512 alexandrine lines in rhyming couplets, had taken him four years to complete, and it immediately secured his fame. With "Le Cimetière marin" and "L'Ébauche d'un serpent," it is often considered one of the greatest French poems of the twentieth century.

The title was chosen late in the poem's gestation; it refers to the youngest of the three Parcae (the minor Roman deities also called The Fates), though for some readers the connection with that mythological figure is tenuous and problematic.

The poem is written in the first person, and is the soliloquy of a young woman contemplating life and death, engagement and withdrawal, love and estrangement, in a setting dominated by the sea, the sky, stars, rocky cliffs, and the rising sun. However, it is also possible to read the poem as an allegory on the way fate moves human affairs or as an attempt to comprehend the horrific violence in Europe at the time of the poem's composition. The poem is not about World War I, but it does try to address the relationships between destruction and beauty, and, in this sense, it resonates with ancient Greek meditations on these matters, especially in the plays of Sophocles and Aeschylus. There are, therefore, evident links with le Cimetière marin, which is also a seaside meditation on comparably large themes.

Other works
Before la Jeune Parque, Valéry's only publications of note were dialogues, articles, some poems, and a study of Leonardo da Vinci. In 1920 and 1922, he published two slim collections of verses. The first, Album des vers anciens (Album of old verses), was a revision of early but beautifully wrought smaller poems, some of which had been published individually before 1900. The second, Charmes (from the Latin carmina, meaning "songs" and also "incantations"), further confirmed his reputation as a major French poet.  The collection includes le Cimetière marin, and many smaller poems with diverse structures.

Technique
Valéry's technique is quite orthodox in its essentials. His verse rhymes and scans in conventional ways, and it has much in common with the work of Mallarmé. His poem, Palme, inspired James Merrill's celebrated 1974 poem Lost in Translation, and his cerebral lyricism also influenced the American poet, Edgar Bowers.

Prose works
Valéry described his “true oeuvre” to be prose, and he filled more than 28,000 notebook pages over his lifetime. His far more ample prose writings, peppered with many aphorisms and bons mots, reveal a skeptical outlook on human nature, verging on the cynical. His view of state power was broadly liberal insofar as he believed that state power and infringements on the individual should be severely limited. Although he had flirted with nationalist ideas during the 1890s, he moved away from them by 1899, and believed that European culture owed its greatness to the ethnic diversity and universalism of the Roman Empire. He denounced the myth of "racial purity" and argued that such purity, if it existed, would only lead to stagnation—thus the mixing of races was necessary for progress and cultural development. In "America as a Projection of the European Mind", Valéry remarked that whenever he despaired about Europe's situation, he could "restore some degree of hope only by thinking of
the New World" and mused on the "happy variations" which could result from European "aesthetic ideas filtering into the powerful character of native Mexican art."

Raymond Poincaré, Louis de Broglie, André Gide, Henri Bergson, and Albert Einstein all respected Valéry's thinking and became friendly correspondents. Valéry was often asked to write articles on topics not of his choosing; the resulting intellectual journalism was collected in five volumes titled Variétés.

The notebooks
Valéry's most striking achievement is perhaps his monumental intellectual diary, called the Cahiers (Notebooks). Early every morning of his adult life, he contributed something to the Cahiers, prompting him to write:  "Having dedicated those hours to the life of the mind, I thereby earn the right to be stupid for the rest of the day."

The subjects of his Cahiers entries often were, surprisingly, reflections on science and mathematics. In fact, arcane topics in these domains appear to have commanded far more of his considered attention than his celebrated poetry. The Cahiers also contain the first drafts of many aphorisms he later included in his books.  To date, the Cahiers have been published in their entirety only as photostatic reproductions, and only since 1980 have they begun to receive scholarly scrutiny. The Cahiers have been translated into English in five volumes published by Peter Lang with the title Cahiers/Notebooks.

In recent decades Valéry's thought has been considered a touchstone in the field of constructivist epistemology, as noted, for instance, by Jean-Louis Le Moigne in his description of constructivist history.

In other literature

One of three epigraphs in Cormac McCarthy's novel Blood Meridian is from Valéry's Writing at the Yalu River (1895):
"Your ideas are terrifying and your hearts are faint. Your acts of pity and cruelty are absurd, committed with no calm, as if they were irresistible. Finally, you fear blood more and more. Blood and time".

In the book "El laberinto de la soledad" from Octavio Paz there are three verses of one of Valéry's poems: 
Je pense, sur le bord doré de l’univers
A ce gout de périr qui prend la Pythonisse
En qui mugit l’espoir que le monde finisse.

In popular culture
Oscar-winning Japanese director Hayao Miyazaki's 2013 film The Wind Rises and the Japanese novel of the same name (on which the film was partially based) take their title from Valéry's verse "Le vent se lève... il faut tenter de vivre !" ("The wind rises… We must try to live!") in the poem "Le Cimetière marin" (The Graveyard by the Sea). The same quote is used in the closing sentences of Anthony Burgess's 1962 novel The Wanting Seed.

Selected works
 Conte de nuits (1888)
 Paradoxe sur l’architecte (1891) 
 Introduction à la méthode de Léonard de Vinci (1895)
 La soirée avec monsieur Teste (1896)
 La Jeune Parque (1917)
 Album des vers anciens (1920)
 Le cimetière marin (1920)
 Charmes (1922)
 Eupalinos ou l’Architecte (1923) 
 Variétés I (1924)
 La Crise de l'Esprit (1924) Translated into German in 1956 by Herbert Steiner (Die Krise des Geistes)
 L'Âme et la Danse (1925)
 Variétés II (1930)
 Regards sur le monde actuel. (1931)
 L'idée fixe (1932)
 Moralités (1932)
 Variétés III (1936)
 Degas, danse, dessin (1936)
 Variétes IV (1938)
 Mauvaises pensées et autres (1942)
 Tel quel (1943)
 Variétes V (1944)
 Vues (1948)
 Œuvres I (1957), édition établie et annotée par Jean Hytier, Bibliothèque de la Pléiade / nrf Gallimard
 Œuvres II (1960), édition établie et annotée par Jean Hytier, Bibliothèque de la Pléiade / nrf Gallimard
 Prose et Vers (1968)
 Cahiers I (1973), édition établie, présentée et annotée par Judith Robinson-Valéry, Bibliothèque de la Pléiade / nrf Gallimard
 Cahiers II (1974), édition établie, présentée et annotée par Judith Robinson-Valéry, Bibliothèque de la Pléiade / nrf Gallimard
 Cahiers (1894–1914) (1987), édition publiée sous la direction de Nicole Celeyrette-Pietri et Judith Robinson-Valéry avec la collaboration de Jean Celeyrette, Maria Teresa Giaveri, Paul Gifford, Jeannine Jallat, Bernard Lacorre, Huguette Laurenti, Florence de Lussy, Robert Pickering, Régine Pietra et Jürgen Schmidt-Radefeldt, tomes I-IX, Collection blanche, Gallimard

In English translation:
 1964. Selected Writings of Paul Valery. New Directions.
 1968. Sketch of a Serpent. R. A. Christmas, trans. Dialogue. Second version printed in Christmas's collection of his own work, Leaves of Sass (2019).
 1975. Collected Works of Paul Valéry. Princeton University Press.
 1977. Paul Valery: An Anthology. James Lawler, ed. Bollingen (Princeton Univ. Press).
 1989. The Outlook for Intelligence. Denise Foliot and Jackson Mathews, trans. Bollingen (Princeton Univ. Press).
 2000. Cahiers/Notebooks. Volume I. Editor-in-chief: Brian Stimpson. Associate editors Paul Gifford, Robert Pickering. Translated by Paul Gifford. Frankfurt am Main: Peter Lang.
2020. The Idea of Perfection: The Poetry and Prose of Paul Valéry; A Bilingual Edition. Trans. Nathaniel Rudavsky-Brody (Farrar, Straus and Giroux).

See also

Bonini's paradox
Paul Valéry University, Montpellier III

References

Further reading
 Sylvie Ballestra-Puech, Lecture de la Jeune Parque, Klincksieck, 1993
 Philippe Baudry, Valéry trouveur: métaphysique et littérature, Kindle, 2010; CreateSpace, 2011
 Philippe Baudry, Valéry Finder: Metaphysics and Literature, Kindle, 2011; CreateSpace, 2011
 Denis Bertholet, Paul Valéry, 1871–1945, Plon, 1995 (biography)
 Serge Bourjea, Paul Valéry, le sujet de l'écriture, L'Harmattan, 2000
 Emile Michel Cioran, Valéry face à ses idoles, L'Herne, Essais et Philosophie, 2007
 Andrea Pasquino, I Cahiers di Paul Valéry, Bulzoni Editore, 1979
 Michel Jarrety, Paul Valéry, Fayard, 2008 (biography)
 Octave Nadal, La Jeune Parque, manuscrit, présentation, étude critique, Le Club du Meilleur Livre, 1957
 Suzanne Nash, Paul Valéry's Album de Vers Anciens – A Past Transfigured, Princeton University Press, 1983
 Jeanine Parisier-Plottel, Les dialogues de Paul Valéry, Presses universitaires de France, 1960
Jeanine Parisier Plottel, The Poetics of Autobiography in Paul Valery, L'Esprit Créateur, (Johns Hopkins University Press), vol 20, no. 3, 1980, pp. 38–45
Michel Philippon, Paul Valéry, une Poétique en poèmes, Presses Universitaires de Bordeaux, 1993
 Michel Philippon, Un Souvenir d'enfance de Paul Valéry, Éditions InterUniversitaires, 1996
 Judith Robinson-Valéry, L'Analyse de l'esprit dans les Cahiers de Valéry, Corti, 1963
 Judith Robinson-Valéry, Fonctions de l'esprit: treize savants redécouvrent Paul Valéry, Hermann, 1983
 Fabien Vasseur commente La Jeune Parque, Poésies'', Foliothèque, Gallimard, 2006

External links

 Ressources sur Paul Valéry. 
 Crisis of the Mind essay 
 Essay on Paul Valery's Aesthetics
 Research Guide on Intellectual Cooperation – Notable Members by UN Archives Geneva.
 Books by Paul Valéry at Project Gutenberg (in French)

1871 births
1945 deaths
People from Sète
French people of Italian descent
French people of Corsican descent
Lycée Condorcet alumni
Academic staff of the Collège de France
French journalists
French poets
Symbolist poets
Aphorists
Epistemologists
20th-century French philosophers
Members of the Académie Française
Prix Blumenthal
French male essayists
French male poets
20th-century French essayists
20th-century French male writers
French agnostics